Rabbit River may refer to several places:

 Rabbit River (Michigan)
 Rabbit River (Bois de Sioux), a river in Minnesota
 Rabbit River (Mississippi River tributary), a river in Minnesota
 Rabbit River, a tributary of the Liard River in British Columbia

See also 
 Rabbit Creek (disambiguation)